Out of the Darkness is a 1985 American made-for-television crime thriller film about the pursuit of the serial killer David Berkowitz by New York City detective Ed Zigo played by Martin Sheen.

Cast
 Martin Sheen as Eddie Zigo
 Héctor Elizondo as Father George
 Matt Clark as John Hubbard
 Jennifer Salt as Ann Zigo
 Eddie Egan as Tom Duncan
 Robert Trebor as David Berkowitz
 Val Avery as Guido Pressano
 Joe Spinell as Jim Halsey
 Victor Arnold as Nick Zigo
 Charlie Sheen as Man Shaving

References

External links
 

1985 television films
1985 films
1980s crime thriller films
1980s serial killer films
American docudrama films
American police detective films
Films directed by Jud Taylor
Crime films based on actual events
Cultural depictions of David Berkowitz
Films scored by Billy Goldenberg
American drama television films
1980s English-language films
1980s American films